Castelli Partido is a partido on the east coast of Buenos Aires Province in Argentina.

Settlements
Castelli
Guerrero
Cerro de La Gloria

References

External links

 

Partidos of Buenos Aires Province